The Rockwell Commander 685 or Aero Commander 685 is a light-twin piston-engined aircraft with a pressurized cabin originally built by the Aero Commander company, a division of Rockwell International from 1965. 

The predecessor model was the Aero Commander 690 and the next generation are Aero Commander JetProp series. The Aero Commander 685 had the ICAO aircraft code AC6L The introduction was in 1971 and the retired in 1976; in this time are built 66 aircraft.

Design and development
The Commander 685 was a piston-engined variant of the turboprop-powered Rockwell Commander 690, with two wing-mounted 435 hp Continental GTSIO-520K piston engines in tractor configuration with three-bladed Hartzell feathering propellers. It is a high-wing cantilever monoplane with an enclosed nine-seat cabin and a retractable nose-wheel landing gear. The Model 685 was type certified by the Federal Aviation Administration on 17 September 1971.

Specifications

References

Further reading

External links

685
1970s United States business aircraft
High-wing aircraft
Aircraft first flown in 1971
Twin piston-engined tractor aircraft